Seith Mann (born 1973) is an American film and television director. He directed Five Deep Breaths and has gone on to direct for The Wire, Grey's Anatomy and Fringe.

Biography
Mann was inspired to become a director when he saw the Spike Lee film Do the Right Thing. Mann graduated from Morehouse College and later earned an MFA in film at the Tisch School of the Arts at New York University.

Five Deep Breaths
Mann's thesis at New York University was the short film Five Deep Breaths. It was awarded the Spike Lee fellowship while in development in 2002. The film is set at an all-black college. After a physical assault upon a young woman by her boyfriend, another man, Mark, and his friends are moved to take revenge. Mann has commented that he likes morally ambiguous situations. The short starred Jamie Hector, Anslem Richardson, Marcuis Harris, Harvey Gardner Moore, Curtiss Cook, and Ka'ramuu Kush. The score was composed by jazz musician Jason Moran.

The film premiered at the 2003 Sundance Film Festival. It won first place in the Charles and Lucille King Family Foundation Award (for Best Short Film), and The Carl Lerner Award for Film with Social Significance at the 2003 New York University First Run Festival. It was selected to screen at the 2003 Tribeca Film Festival and one of four American shorts to screen at the Cinefondation Competition at the 2003 Cannes Film Festival. It won a Gold Plaque for Narrative Short Film at the 2003 Chicago International Film Festival. It also won the Best Narrative Short Film award at the 2003 Los Angeles IFP/West Film Festival.

Film maker magazine named Mann one of their 25 new faces of independent film in 2003. They praised his direction of Five Short Breaths as "skillful". The IFP gave Mann the Gordon Parks Awards for Emerging African-American Filmmakers following the film's release.

Television
Television Producer Robert F. Colesberry saw Five Deep Breaths and introduced the other producers of HBO drama The Wire to it. The producers approached Mann and asked him to shadow their directors during production of the third season in 2004. Show runner David Simon recalls that Colesberry wanted Mann to direct a third season episode but Colesberry's untimely death left the other producers reeling and they felt unable to risk a directorial debut in their first season without him. Simon recalls Mann shadowing director Ernest R. Dickerson and showing a "careful interest in the process."

In 2006, Mann joined the directing crew of The Wire'''s fourth season. Simon felt obligated to give Mann a chance after his dedication to shadowing Dickerson. Mann made his television directing debut with the third episode of the season, "Home Rooms". Simon was pleased with the episode and described it as "beautifully covered."

Mann also was an ABC DGA Fellow class of 2005, a fellowship aimed at encouraging "diversity of race, gender and spirit in the filmmaking community." In 2007 Mann was nominated for an NAACP Image Award in the category Outstanding Directing in a Dramatic Series for his work on episode "Home Rooms". Mann has commented that he was "excited" to receive the nomination and grateful to the NAACP for their work.

After The Wire, Mann worked on Grey's Anatomy directing two episodes in 2006, "The Name of the Game" and "Don't Stand So Close to Me". In 2007, Mann was nominated for a DGA Award in the category Outstanding Directorial Achievement in Comedy Series for his work on "The Name of the Game". Mann has also directed episodes of Heroes, Cold Case, Lincoln Heights, Jericho, Entourage, Friday Night Lights, Men in Trees, Shark, Fringe, Blindspotting, and The Walking Dead.

Future projects
Mann is working on a feature film script entitled Come Sunday. The script won two development awards (the Emerging Narrative Screenwriting Award and the Gordon Parks Award for Screenwriting) from the IFP in 2004. In 2010, Mann was announced as director of Miss: Better Living Through Crime with Spike Lee producing. In 2016, Mann was writing the Black movie.

Filmography

Director

EditorAll We Know of Heaven (2004)Where to Find God on Sunday (2000)Kiss It Up to God (2000)

WriterBlack (TBA)Five Deep Breaths (2003)Apology (2001)

Assistant DirectorThe Living Silence'' (2003)

References

External links
 

1973 births
African-American film directors
African-American television directors
American film directors
American television directors
Living people
Morehouse College alumni
Tisch School of the Arts alumni
Place of birth missing (living people)